Evan Jones (born 1973 in Weston, York, Ontario) is a Canadian poet and critic. He completed his secondary education at Lawrence Park Collegiate Institute in Toronto. In 2003, he was a finalist for the Governor General's Literary Awards for Poetry. He is currently a creative writing teacher at the University of Bolton, where he resides full-time.

Works

Poetry

Anthologies
 
  (with Todd Swift)
  (with Amanda Jernigan)

Awards
 2003 Finalist, Governor General's Award for Poetry

Reviews
The words ‘exciting’ and ‘necessary’ are too often bandied about when a new(-ish) writer surfaces, but this book is both of these things. Jones reintroduces surrealism back into the mainstream of British poetry, but he also does something new. He shows that surrealism can deal with identity in a way which is contemporary and responsive to the internationalised lives which are lead {sic} in the twenty-first century.

Paralogues is a remarkable second collection: other Canadian poets use Europe as a kind of arena for their lyric experiments - Don Coles’ Sweden, or the classical world as re-interpreted by Anne Carson or Norm Sibum – but Jones’s poems are much more tangled and materially dense than the work of his older compatriots. .

External links
Author Page Carcanet Press
Not Oedipus The New Criterion essay by Evan Jones
Author Page AGNI two poems by Evan Jones

References

1973 births
Living people
21st-century Canadian poets
Writers from Ontario
Canadian male poets
21st-century Canadian male writers